Mamani is the debut studio album by German recording artist Joy Denalane. It was released by Four Music in association with Columbia Records on June 3, 2002 in German-speaking Europe. The album was produced by Max Herre, while additional production was provided by Timmy W., Don Phillipe, Franc Kuruc and Tom Krüger. The album peaked at #8 on the German album chart, selling over 300,000 copies. Altogether Mamani spawned six singles: "Sag's Mir", "Geh Jetzt", "Was Auch Immer", "Im Ghetto von Soweto", "Kinderlied" and "Höchste Zeit".

Track listing

Personnel

 Dan Abitol – violin
 Odile Biard – violin
 Felix Borel – violin
 Minu Constantin – vocal assistance
 Ian Cumming – trombone
 Fola Dada – vocal assistance
 Kathrin Distler – cello
 Ross Feltus – photography
 Andreas Fischer – viola
 Klaus Graf – saxophone
 Daniel Gottschalk – photography
 Max Herre – executive producer, producer
 Denise Hill – vocal assistance
 Michael Kedaisch – marimba
 Cherie Kedida – vocal assistance
 Franc Kuruc – guitar, producer
 Tom Krüger – bass, producer, mixing, mastering

 Dalma Lima – percussion
 Chiwoniso Maraire – mbira
 Klaus Marquardt – violin
 Stephanos Notopoulos – photography
 Claudia Pfister – violin
 Don Phillipe – wurlitzer, producer, mixing
 Raphael Sacha – viola
 Samir – vocal assistance
 Christoph Sauer – bass
 Violina Sauleva – viola
 Lillo Scrimali – piano, organ, synthesizer
 Tim Ströble – cello
 Sebastian Studinitzky – horn
 Felix Thomas – vocal assistance
 Myriam Trück – violin
 Matthias Trück – cello
 Tommy W. – drums, producer, mixing

Charts

Weekly charts

Year-end charts

Certifications

References

External links
 JoyDenalane.com – official site
 

2002 debut albums
Joy Denalane albums